Michael Rank (1950 – May 20, 2017) was a British author. He was a journalist in China in the early 1980s, and visited Tibet in 1983.

Education 
Rank graduated in 1972 from Downing College, Cambridge, University of Cambridge in Chinese studies. He also pursued studies in Peking University and Fudan University in Shanghai from 1974 to 1976.

Career 
Based in London, Rank was Reuters correspondent in Beijing. He visited the city of Rason in North Korea in 2010.  He also published articles in The Guardian, "Asia Times Online", "BBC Wildlife", and 'North Korea Economy Watch'.

He later became a translator from Chinese to English and a freelance journalist. His interest in birds led him to study the life of Frank Ludlow and the history of English School of Gyantse. One of his articles on this subject was published by the Namgyal Institute of Tibetology.

He published three articles in the Royal Society for Asian Affairs.

Articles 
 2014 "Nineteen Eighty-four in China", The Asia-Pacific Journal 9 June 2014.
 2012 The Ponghwa behind Pyongyang's throne, "Asia Times Online", January 12, 2012.
 2009 Ludlow, Frank (1885–1972), Oxford Dictionary of National Biography, Oxford University Press, May 2009
 2004 King Arthur comes to Tibet: Frank Ludlow and the English school in Gyantse, 1923-26, Namgyal Bulletin of Tibetology, 2004
 2003 Frank Ludlow and the English School in Tibet 1923-1926, Volume 34, number 1 Asian Affairs, Royal Society for Asian Affairs, 2003
 2001 (with Axel Bräunlich) "Notes on the occurrence of the Corncrake (Crex crex) in Asia and in the Pacific region", In Schäffer, n.; Mammen, U (PDF). Proceedings International Workshop 1998 Corncrake. Hilpoltstein, Germany. 2001

Footnotes

External links 
  "Wild leopards of Beijing" by Michael Rank. 
  Notes on Michael Rank. 
  more notes on Michael Rank. 
 Blog of Michael Rank
 Obituary in The Baron, 21 May 2017
 Obituary in The Guardian, 22 Aug 2017

1950 births
2017 deaths
English ornithologists
English male journalists
Tibetologists
English translators
Chinese–English translators
Alumni of Downing College, Cambridge
Peking University alumni
Experts on North Korea
20th-century British translators